The 1983 Men's World Team Squash Championships were held in Auckland and Hamilton, New Zealand and took place from October 13 until October 21, 1983.

Seeds

Results

Pool 1 

Note* = New Zealand Youth ineligible for qualification to next round.

Pool 2

Pool 3

Pool 4

Final Pool A

Final Pool B

Semi-finals

Third Place Play Off

Final

References

See also 
World Team Squash Championships
World Squash Federation
World Open (squash)

World Squash Championships
Squash tournaments in New Zealand
International sports competitions hosted by New Zealand
Squash
Men